The Shvo catalyst is an organoruthenium compound that catalyzes the hydrogenation of polar functional groups including aldehydes, ketones and imines. The compound is of academic interest as an early example of a catalyst for transfer hydrogenation that operates by an "outer sphere mechanism". Related derivatives are known where p-tolyl replaces some of the phenyl groups. Shvo's catalyst represents a subset of homogeneous hydrogenation catalysts that involves both metal and ligand in its mechanism.

Synthesis and structure
The catalyst is named after Youval Shvo, who uncovered it through studies on the effect of diphenylacetylene on the catalytic properties of triruthenium dodecacarbonyl. The reaction of diphenylacetylene and Ru3(CO)12 gives the piano stool complex .  Subsequent hydrogenation of this tricarbonyl affords Shvo's catalyst. The iron analogue is also known, see Knölker complex.

The compound contains a pair of equivalent Ru centres that are bridged by a strong hydrogen bond and a bridging hydride. In solution, the complex dissociates unsymmetrically:
(C5Ph4O)2HRu2H(CO)4  C5Ph4OH)RuH(CO)2 + (C5Ph4O)Ru(CO)2

Hydrogenation catalysis

In the presence of a suitable hydrogen donor or hydrogen gas, Shvo's catalyst effects the hydrogenation of several polar functional groups, e.g. aldehydes, ketones, imines, and iminium ions. Many alkenes and ketones undergo hydrogenation, although conditions are forcing: 145 °C (500 psi). One obstacle to the use of Shvo's catalyst in the hydrogenation of alkynes is its propensity to bind the alkyne quite tightly, forming a stable complex that gradually poisons the catalyst. Intramolecular reactions proceed as well, illustrated by the conversion of allylic alcohols to ketones. Shvo's catalyst also catalyzes dehydrogenations.

Mechanism
The mechanism of hydrogenation catalyzed by Shvo's catalyst has been a matter of debate, broadly between two alternative descriptions of the double bond's interaction with the complex at the rate-determining step. The proposed alternatives are an inner-sphere mechanism, where the transition state involves interaction with the metal only, and an outer-sphere mechanism, in which the cyclopentadienol proton also interacts with the substrate. Kinetic isotope studies provide evidence of a concerted transfer due to strong rate influence from both the ligand -OH and the metal hydride.

Other reactions
Shvo's catalyst facilitates the Tishchenko reaction, i.e., the formation of esters from alcohols. The early step in this reaction is the conversion of the primary alcohol to the aldehyde.

Addition of the amine is facilitated through oxidation to the ynone, followed by reduction of the product.

Another case of "hydrogen borrowing", the alkylation of amines using other amines is also promoted by Shvo's catalyst. The reaction proceeds through oxidation to an imine, which allows nucleophilic attack, followed by an elimination step and reduction of the double bond.

References

Organoruthenium compounds
Carbonyl complexes
Hydrogenation catalysts